The unicameral parliament of the Serbian autonomous province of Vojvodina is known as the Assembly of the Autonomous Province of Vojvodina (Pannonian Rusyn: Скупштина Автономней Покраїни Войводини).

The President of the Assembly was István Pásztor of the Alliance of Vojvodina Hungarians (SVM). The current parliament was elected in 2020.

It is elected by proportional representation.

Provincial elections

Last election

Past elections
1996 Vojvodina provincial election
2000 Vojvodina provincial election
2004 Vojvodina provincial election
2008 Vojvodina provincial election
2012 Vojvodina provincial election
2016 Vojvodina provincial election

Parliamentary groups and parties
Number of seats in the assembly (after 2020 elections):
SNS coalition (SNS) - 76
Socialist Party of Serbia-United Serbia (SPS-JS) - 13
Alliance of Vojvodina Hungarians (SVM) - 11
League of Social Democrats of Vojvodina (LSV) - 6
Democratic Party of Serbia (DSS) - 5
Movement for the Restoration of the Kingdom of Serbia (POKS) - 5
Serbian Radical Party (SRS) - 4

Current Organisation
President: István Pásztor
Vice-presidents: Aleksandra Đanković, Nemanja Zavišić, Damir Zobenica, Aleksandra Maletić, Dejan Čapo
General Secretary: Nikola Banjac

President of Assembly

External links
Assembly of Vojvodina

Politics of Vojvodina